Myriochila is a genus of tiger beetles in the family Cicindelidae, containing the following species:

 Myriochila akhteri Cassola & Wiesner, 2009
 Myriochila albomarginalis (W.Horn, 1900) 
 Myriochila atelesta (Chaudoir, 1854) 
 Myriochila basilewskyi Cassola, 1978 
 Myriochila chateneti Rivalier, 1965 
 Myriochila cornusafricae Cassola, 1987 
 Myriochila deprimozi (Babault, 1913) 
 Myriochila distinguenda (Dejean, 1825) 
 Myriochila divina (W.Horn, 1893) 
 Myriochila dorsata (Brulle, 1834) 
 Myriochila dubia (W.Horn, 1892) 
 Myriochila dumolinii (Dejean, 1831) 
 Myriochila ehlersi (W.Horn, 1914) 
 Myriochila fastidiosa (Dejean, 1825) 
 Myriochila flavidens (Guerin-Meneville, 1849)
 Myriochila georgwerneri Werner, 1998 
 Myriochila haladai Kudrna, 2010 
 Myriochila hauseri (W.Horn, 1898) 
 Myriochila jordaniana (W.Horn, 1898) 
 Myriochila jucunda (Peringuey, 1892) 
 Myriochila legalli Kudrna, 2008 
 Myriochila lomii (W.Horn, 1938) 
 Myriochila malzyi Rivalier, 1965 
 Myriochila mastersi (Laporte de Castelnau, 1867) 
 Myriochila melancholica (Fabricius, 1798) 
 Myriochila mirei Basilewsky, 1962 
 Myriochila moseri (W.Horn, 1901) 
 Myriochila nudopectoralis (W.Horn, 1903) 
 Myriochila orientalis (Dejean, 1825) 
 Myriochila parasemicincta (Freitag, 1979)
 Myriochila pauliani (Colas, 1942) 
 Myriochila peringueyi (W.Horn, 1895) 
 Myriochila perplexa (Dejean, 1825)
 Myriochila philippinensis (Mandl, 1956) 
 Myriochila plebeja (Sloane, 1905) 
 Myriochila plurinotata (Audouin & Brulle, 1839) 
 Myriochila respiciens (W.Horn, 1920) 
 Myriochila semicincta (Brulle, 1834) 
 Myriochila sericeolongicornis (W.Horn, 1926) 
 Myriochila sinica (Fleutiaux, 1889) 
 Myriochila specularis (Chaudoir, 1865) 
 Myriochila timoriensis (Jordan, 1894) 
 Myriochila trilunaris (Klug, 1832)
 Myriochila turkana Werner & Oesterle, 2000 
 Myriochila undulata (Dejean, 1825) 
 Myriochila vicina (Dejean, 1831)

References

External links

Cicindelidae